Kemp Creek is a stream in the US state of Georgia.

Kemp Creek was named after John Kemp, a pioneer settler and landowner.  A variant name is "Kemps Creek".

References

Rivers of Georgia (U.S. state)
Rivers of Wilkes County, Georgia